Ronnie Cutrone (July 10, 1948 – July 21, 2013) was an American pop artist known for his large-scale paintings of some of America's favorite cartoon characters, such as Felix the Cat, Pink Panther, Woody Woodpecker and No Glove No Love.

Style
Cutrone's paintings are colorful, lively, and less challenging than those of his contemporaries.  As Andy Warhol's assistant at the Factory atop the Decker Building from 1972 until 1980, Cutrone worked with Warhol on paintings, prints, films, and other concepts, eventually co-opting Warhol's earliest work (pre-1960) as well as works by Roy Lichtenstein and others, until finally distilling those myriad influences into the style a few critics eventually labeled "Post-Pop."

He exhibited at the Niveau Gallery in 1979 with a Scottish artist called Mike Gall who showed paintings of Snoopy, Mickey and Minnie mouse, the Pink Panther and also a small series of Peter Rabbit paintings. In this exhibition no evidence of the style the critics would call "Post-Pop" could be seen in Cutrone's work.
Victor Hugo was the other artist who was featured in this three man group show which was called "Three New New York Artists".

In 1980, Cutrone's place was taken by Jay Shriver so that Cutrone could concentrate on his own painting. He achieved international acclaim with his very first post-Warhol show. At the same time Mike Gall died in a car crash in Scotland following the death of his father.

Together with Kenny Scharf, Cutrone revived the comic strip in painting. By using established comic characters such as Woody Woodpecker and Felix the Cat, Cutrone rephrased themes of originality and authorship, and of low-brow taste and fine art which makes him directly indebted to Pop Art of early Sixties.  His use of bright and fluorescent colours encouraged Andy Warhol's return to such hues of heightened artificiality.

"Everything is a cartoon for me," Ronnie Cutrone says. "The ancient manuscripts are taken very seriously but they really are cartoons."

Ronnie died in 2013 at his home in Lake Peekskill, NY.

Collections
Cutrone's works have been exhibited at: Whitney Museum (New York), Museum of Modern Art (New York), Museum Boijmans Van Beuningen (Rotterdam), the Museum of Contemporary Art, Los Angeles and fine art galleries internationally.

Personal
Cutrone was married four times. His first two marriages were to makeup artist Gigi Williams. In 1986 he married Kelly Cutrone. His third wife was an Israeli woman, Einat Katav, and that marriage also ended in divorce.

External links 

 "Ronnie Cutrone, a Man of Another, Cooler City", NYTimes.com

Notes

1948 births
2013 deaths
Painters from New York City
American pop artists
20th-century American painters
American male painters
21st-century American painters
People associated with The Factory